Frederick William Johnson  (February 13, 1917 – June 20, 1993) was a Canadian lawyer, judge, and the 16th Lieutenant-Governor of Saskatchewan.

Life
Born in Dudley, Worcestershire, England, the son of a clergyman, he emigrated to Canada with his family settling in Lipton, Saskatchewan when he was eleven. He taught school in Grenfell before serving as an artillery officer during World War II, achieving the rank of major. After the war, he attended the University of Saskatchewan and received a law degree in 1949. He practised law in Regina and was appointed Queen's Counsel in 1963.

He ran as a Liberal candidate in the 1960 provincial election, losing to Allan Blakeney. In 1962, he ran as a federal Liberal for the electoral district of Regina City, losing to Progressive Conservative Kenneth Hamill More.

He was appointed to the Court of Queen's Bench in 1965 and from 1977 to 1983 served as Chief Justice of that court. From 1983 to 1988 he was the sixteenth Lieutenant-Governor of Saskatchewan and was the first chancellor of the Saskatchewan Order of Merit.

His wife Joyce Johnson was an eminent piano teacher. In 1990, he was made an Officer of the Order of Canada "for his dedication to the arts, education and the environment and for his contribution to Saskatchewan's history and heritage". In 1991 was awarded the Saskatchewan Order of Merit.

Honorific eponyms
Schools
  Saskatchewan: F.W. Johnson Collegiate, Regina

References

1917 births
1993 deaths
English emigrants to Canada
People from Dudley
Candidates in the 1962 Canadian federal election
Lieutenant Governors of Saskatchewan
Members of the Saskatchewan Order of Merit
Officers of the Order of Canada
Judges in Saskatchewan
Canadian King's Counsel
Liberal Party of Canada candidates for the Canadian House of Commons